Xinmi, formerly Mi County, is a county-level city of Henan Province, South Central China, it is under the administration of the prefecture-level city of Zhengzhou.

Administrative divisions
As of 2012, the city is divided to 4 subdistricts, 11 towns, 2 townships and 1 other.
Subdistricts

Towns

Townships
Yuanzhuang Township
Quliang Township

Others
Jianshan Scenic Area

Climate

References

Notes

External links
Official website of Xinmi Government

County-level divisions of Henan
Zhengzhou